This is a list of the number-one hits and albums of 2001 on Italian Charts.

See also
2001 in music
List of number-one hits in Italy

References

External links
FIMI archives
Hit Parade Italia

2001
2001 in Italian music
2001 record charts